Gatewood Sanders Lincoln (August 5, 1875 – October 15, 1957) was a United States Navy officer who served as the governor of American Samoa. With Nathan Woodworth Post, Lincoln was one of only two American Samoan governors to serve non-consecutive terms. He commanded a supply ship during World War I, and was an instructor at the United States Naval Academy, serving as Department Head of the College of Electrical Engineering and Physics.

Biography
Gatewood Lincoln was born in Liberty, Missouri to James Edwin and Margaret Lincoln, natives of Lexington, Kentucky. His father, a cousin of Abraham Lincoln, was probate judge of Clay County. Gatewood was James Lincoln's mother's maiden name. Lincoln studied at William Jewell College in Liberty, before he was appointed to the United States Naval Academy in 1892.

Naval career
Lincoln graduated from the Naval Academy in 1896, having been trained as a naval engineer. He ranked second in his class and received his first assignment by request of the captain of the USS Philadelphia. He was awarded the Navy Cross for his conduct as captain of the USS Powhatan on convoy duty during World War I.

Lincoln served on the United States Shipping Board advisory board during the 1930s, and also at the Mare Island Naval Shipyard. During WW I, he saw active duty in command of a supply ship in the Atlantic. After the war, as a Commander, Lincoln was department head of Electrical Engineering and Physics at the Naval Academy.  In 1943, he was called back to active duty to take command of the Naval Ammunition Depot Fallbrook, California.

Governorship

Lincoln served two terms as Governor of American Samoa, from 2 August 1929 to 24 March 1931 and from 17 July 1931 to 12 May 1932.

References

1875 births
1957 deaths
People from Liberty, Missouri
Governors of American Samoa
United States Navy officers
United States Naval Academy alumni
United States Naval Academy faculty
American engineers
William Jewell College alumni
Recipients of the Navy Cross (United States)
Lincoln family